Shehnaz Sheikh is a Pakistani television actress, host, and theatre director. She has appeared in the drama serials  Tanhaiyaan and Ankahi, as well as the show Uncle Sargam. After her successful television career, she left the industry in the mid-1990s and has since been retired.

Early life and education
Sheikh was born in Kalaw, Burma, and later migrated to Pakistan in 1965 as a UN refugee and settled in Lahore, Pakistan, with her family, including her aunt, classical musician, Saffia Beyg. She attended the Convent of Jesus and Mary, Lahore, and later attended the National College of Arts where she graduated with a degree in Fine Arts.

Career

Acting and hosting
Talking about start of her acting career, Sheikh said that "I wasn’t really ‘discovered’ as most actors and actresses are. Someone had actually referred me to Haseena Moin for Ajnabi. She and Shoaib Mansoor invited me to try out for one of the roles." Sheikh made her debut in 1980 with drama serial Balila which was written by Shoaib Hashmi. The show aired only few episodes and it got cancelled later but Sheikh already got noticed by that time and signed in drama serial Ankahi written by Haseena Moin and directed by Syed Mohsin Ali and Shoaib Mansoor. She played the role of Sana Murad an ambitious and level headed girl from middle-class family.

Her next drama Maray Thay Jin K Liye was a critical success. Her performance as a modern, independent woman who is still conservative at heart was praised.

After the success of Ankahi, Sheikh again collaborated with Hassena Moin in her next drama serial Tanhaiyaan directed by Shahzad Kalil. The show got massive critical and commercial success and now considered cult classic.

Raj Kapoor was looking for a Pakistani actress for his film Henna. He wanted Hina Durrani to be the lead heroine in Henna after meeting her in India during her visit with her mother Noor Jehan in 1982 but she refused. Then Kapoor wanted to cast Sheikh but she refused to work in the movie. So after her refusal Haseena Moin recommended Zeba Bakhtiar, thus Zeba was cast in the title role of Henna. When the film released in 1991 it was a success and was also chosen as India's entry for Best Foreign Language Film at the Oscars.

In the early 1990s she appeared in couple of episodes of shows such as Uncle Sargam and Yes Sir, No Sir. She also hosted shows Showbiz Masala for NTM and Meri Pasand for PTV.

Retirement from acting
During an interview, Sheikh described her reasons of not acting anymore because of lack of new characters and challenges as an artist. She said that, "I didn’t want to restrict myself to characters which depicted the exact same personality. I wanted to branch out into something more diverse, more challenging,"

Tanhaiyan Naye Silsilay
After 27 years of Tanhaiyaan drama serial, a sequel named Olper's Tanhaiyan: Naye Silsilay was aired in late 2012. The script was co-written by Haseena Moin and Mohammad Ahmed and directed by Marina Khan. Six of the 16 original cast members reprised their roles but Sheikh refused the offer since she has quit acting. But Haseena Moin wanted her to render her voice for some letters her character has written to her sister in the drama. Sheikh agreed to doing a voice-over but demanded some amount for it. According to Haseena Moin, the sponsors refused to pay and she in return turned down the voice-over offer too.

During an interview, Haseena Moin said about Sheikh's refusal of the offer to be a part of Tanhaiyan Naye Silsilay that "My guess is that as she had created an image in the past serial with her looks and young age, she didn’t want to spoil it." Sheikh's character was subsequently killed off before the events of Tanhaiyan Naye Silsilay.

Theater direction
In 2010, Sheikh moved into theater, and directed Agatha Christie's 1960 play The Mousetrap at LGS Paragon. She described it as a challenge because, "It isn’t an easy play to perform; not only are the dialogues lengthy, but the names of the characters as well as the places mentioned [in the play] are rather alien for today’s generation and, hence, difficult to remember and pronounce." The play received favourable responses from critics and audiences during its run.

In 2011, she was appointed as one of the judges for LUMS Dramafest.

Personal life
Sheikh married Seerat Hazir on 24 December 1982, who is also a Pakistani Television personality. They have two sons together. She resides in Lahore with her family and teaching and directing children's plays, first at Aitchison College, Lahore and now at Lahore Grammar School, for over 18 years. Talking about her work, she said that, "I thrive in the environment I work in. With adults, I feel one always has to deliver. It’s always ‘what’s it going to be this time?’ You're always on your guard with adults. With children, it's more natural. They take you for what you really are. You don't have to pretend."

In November 2005, she along with her husband worked with FAME, a welfare organisation to help victims of 8 October 2005 earthquake in Northern Pakistan.

Acting credits
 Balila – PTV
 Ankahi (1982) – PTV
 Maray Thay Jin K Liye – PTV
 Tanhaiyaan (1985) – PTV
 Daak Time with Uncle Sargam – PTV
 Anwar Maqsood Show Time – PTV
 Yes Sir, No Sir – PTV
 Showbiz Masala – NTM
 Meri Pasand – PTV
 Star & Style – PTV

Awards and recognition

References

External links
 
 

1962 births
Pakistani television hosts
Living people
20th-century Pakistani actresses
Pakistani Muslims
Pakistani television actresses
Actresses from Lahore
National College of Arts alumni
Pakistani theatre directors
Burmese emigrants to Pakistan
Pakistani women television presenters
21st-century Pakistani actresses
Women theatre directors
Nigar Award winners